The Holy House of Mercy of Macau, is a historic building in Senado Square, Macau, China. Established as a branch of the Santa Casa da Misericórdia, it was first built in 1569 on the orders of the Bishop of Macau, Belchior Carneiro Leitão.

It was a medical clinic and several other social welfare structures in early Macau. It later served as an orphanage and refuge for widows of sailors lost at sea.

It is part of the Historic Centre of Macau, a UNESCO World Heritage Site.

See also
Santa Casa da Misericórdia
List of Bishops of Macau
Leal Senado
Macau General Post Office

External links

Holy House of Mercy,  Information from Macau Government Tourist Office

Holy House of Mercy, Archival Background from the Archives of Macao

Religious buildings and structures completed in 1569
Buildings and structures in Macau
Historic Centre of Macau
1569 establishments in China
1569 establishments in the Portuguese Empire
16th-century establishments in Macau
Portuguese colonial architecture in China